Agathymus polingi, or Poling's giant skipper, is a species of giant skipper in the butterfly family Hesperiidae. It is found in Central America and North America.

The MONA or Hodges number for Agathymus polingi is 4143.

References

Further reading 

 

Megathyminae
Articles created by Qbugbot
Butterflies described in 1905